Sebastian Formella (born 26 May 1987) is a German professional boxer who held the IBO welterweight title from 2019 to 2020.

Professional career
Formella made his professional debut on 3 May 2014, scoring a second-round technical knockout (TKO) victory over Pavel Herman at the Müggelspreehalle in Grünheide, Germany

After compiling a record of 20–0 (10 KOs) he defeated Thulani Mbenge on 6 July 2019 at the CU Arena in Hamburg, Germany, capturing the IBO welterweight title via twelve-round unanimous decision (UD), with the scorecards reading 116–112, 115–112 and 114–113.

Professional boxing record

References

Living people
1987 births
German male boxers
Sportspeople from Schleswig-Holstein
Welterweight boxers
Light-middleweight boxers
Middleweight boxers
International Boxing Organization champions